Simon Cope (born 22 March 1966) is an English former professional cyclist from Sevenoaks, Kent. Cope began cycling in 1978 and rode as professional from 1983 to 1999. He had success at the British National Derny Championships for two consecutive years in 1999 and 2000. Cope was also the National Circuit Race Champion 1997. He subsequently became a coach working on British Cycling's Olympic Academy Programme, spending five years as coach of their women's road and endurance academy. After his post at British Cycling was abolished due to funding cuts, he spent the 2012 season as a directeur sportif at the American  team. In January 2015, he was named as the directeur sportif of the new UCI Continental level team, .

Palmarès

1993
3rd British National Circuit Race Championships (professional)

1997
1st  British National Circuit Race Championships

1999
1st  British National Derny Championships

2000
1st  British National Motor Pace Championships

References

1966 births
Living people
English male cyclists
English cycling coaches
People from Sevenoaks
Sportspeople from Kent